E311 can refer to:
 Octyl gallate, the E-number for a food additive ester
 European route E311, European road
 E 311 road (United Arab Emirates)